The following is a partial list of football stadiums in Malta in order of capacity. Although a number of teams participating in the Maltese football league system own or operate their own stadium, Maltese football league matches are generally played at a neutral stadium.

stadiums
Football venues in Malta
Malta
Football stadiums